Clock Face railway station served the colliery village of Clock Face south of St Helens, England. The station was on the southern section of the St Helens and Runcorn Gap Railway which was later absorbed by the London and North Western Railway.

History
Sources differ on when the station first appeared on public timetables. The Disused Stations website gives 1856 whereas Pixton gives 1854. The station was reduced to 'Halt' status in 1926 and closed completely on 18 June 1951, when passenger trains were withdrawn between Widnes and St Helens.

Services
In 1922 nine "Down" (northbound) trains a day called at Clock Face, 'One class only' (i.e. 3rd Class) and 'Week Days Only' (i.e. not Sundays). The "Up" service was similar. The trains' destinations were St Helens to the north and Ditton Junction to the south, with some travelling beyond to Runcorn or Liverpool Lime Street.

In 1951 the service was sparser but more complex. Six trains called in each direction, Monday to Friday, the early morning ones providing both 1st and 3rd Class accommodation. On Saturdays four trains called in each direction, 3rd Class only. No trains called on Sundays.

References

Notes

Sources

External links

The station on an 1888-1913 Overlay OS Map via National Library of Scotland
The History of Transport in Sutton via suttonbeauty
the station on a 1948 OS Map via npe maps
an illustrated history of the line via 8D Association

Disused railway stations in St Helens, Merseyside
Former London and North Western Railway stations
Railway stations in Great Britain opened in 1856
Railway stations in Great Britain closed in 1951
1852 establishments in England